Eliza Frances Andrews (August 10, 1840 – January 21, 1931) was a popular Southern writer of the Gilded Age. Her works were published in popular magazines and papers, including the New York World and Godey's Lady's Book. Her longer works included The War-Time Journal of a Georgian Girl (1908) and two botany textbooks.

Eliza Frances Andrews gained fame in three fields: authorship, education, and science.  Her passion was writing and she had success both as an essayist and a novelist. Financial troubles forced her to take a teaching career after the deaths of her parents, though she continued to be published. In her retirement she combined two of her interests by writing two textbooks on botany entitled Botany All the Year Round and Practical Botany,  the latter of which became popular in Europe and was translated for schools in France. Andrews's published works, notably her Wartime Journal of a Georgia Girl along with her novels and numerous articles, give a glimpse into bitterness, dissatisfaction, and confusion in the post-Civil War South.

Biography

Early life
Eliza Frances "Fanny" Andrews was born on August 10, 1840, in Washington, Georgia, the second daughter of Annulet Ball and Garnett Andrews, a Georgia superior court judge.  Her father was a lawyer, judge, and plantation owner, possessing around two hundred slaves. Andrews grew up on the family estate, Haywood, the name of which she would later use in a pseudonym, "Elzey Hay". attended the local Ladies' Seminary school, and later graduated among the first class of students from LaGrange Female College in Georgia in 1857. She was well-versed in literature, music, and the arts, and was conversant in both French and Latin. Upon graduating "Fanny" had returned to live at home in the care of her family when the Southern states began to secede from the Union. Her father was notoriously outspoken against secession but, despite his views, three of his sons enlisted in the Confederate States Army and his daughters, too, believed in the rebellion. Thus, while Garnett Andrews refused to allow secessionist ideals to be voiced in his home, his daughters are said to have secretly made the first Confederate flag to fly over the courthouse in her hometown. Conflicting opinions with her father agitated and confused the young Andrews. Her father, who in the words of one biographer "helped his children to learn to love books and learning", had begun suppressing her beliefs. 
	
Late in the war Andrews and her sister were sent to live with her older sister in southwest Georgia and Andrews recorded both her journey and stay in a journal that was later published under the title Wartime Journal of a Georgia Girl: 1864-65. Though not published until 1908, the diary effectively began her career as a writer. Later in 1865, at her father's suggestion, Andrews submitted "A Romance of Robbery," her first published piece, in the New York World. It described the mistreatment of southerners by the reconstruction administrators that were now in control of the South. She penned many articles for a variety of publications on topics such as women's fashion during the war, and a piece on Catherine Littlefield Greene, the woman who was behind the success of Eli Whitney's cotton gin.

Teaching and writing career
In 1873, Andrews' father died, leaving his family with bad investments forcing them to sell the plantation. This sudden financial reversal required Andrews to work. She briefly edited the Washington Gazette but when the editor discovered she was a woman, she was fired. She then became principal at the Girl's High School in Yazoo, Mississippi, where she remained for 7 years. She resigned the position in the early 1880s in order to recuperate from a serious illness. Andrews then returned to Washington to become the principal at her former seminary school. She received an honorary Master of Arts degree from Wesleyan Female College in Macon, Georgiain 1882. In 1885 she moved to Macon, working as a professor of French and literature there from 1886 to 1896.   She also worked as a school librarian during this time period. She returned once again to Washington and devoted herself full-time to lecturing and writing.

The degree of advancement Andrews achieved in her career as a writer, textbook author, and teacher would have been unthinkable had it not been for the collapse of her beloved antebellum estate in Washington, Georgia. The question then becomes whether she was motivated to advance her career and assert her independence out of want or need. A good illustration of her often contradictory nature was her desire to remain unmarried for life. This is apparent in her first novel A Family Secret (1876) which creates a vivid image of the role of women in the post war South. She remarks upon the misery inherent in marrying for money and writes at one point "Oh, the slavery it is to be a woman and not a fool." At the same time, Andrews believed that the domestic wife and mother was the only acceptable role for women in Southern society, and she considered teaching "a mental tread-mill, a dull road traveled over and over requiring only patience." On the surface, her ideas seem to be in direct conflict with her accomplishments as a teacher and scholar, but over time she seems to have become more accepting  that she could not rescue her beloved antebellum society. As she observed in the introduction to her Wartime Journal that “In the lifetime of a single generation the people of the South have been called upon to pass through changes that the rest of the world has taken centuries to accomplish” she had been assuming a new role in an era where society was experiencing rapid economic and social changes.

The influences of the antebellum and wartime South, which Andrews describes as a "unique society," are evident in her work, from the beginning of her writing career to her last pieces.  Between the Confederate surrender in April 1865 and the end of the 1860s, Andrews wrote for several local and national magazines and newspapers, including the New York World and Scott's Monthly, providing commentary on issues the South faced during the early years of Reconstruction; she expressed concerns about universal male suffrage due to African Americans' ignorance of informed voting practices.  Her views regarding black Americans reflect contemporary Southern fears of black enfranchisement.  Similarly, Andrew's essays and novels about women's roles provide strong, often conflicting opinions about ideal females, reflecting the contrast in her commitments to both Southern idealism and her own professional independence.  For example, her early works in the late 1860s argued against women's suffrage, as women's position under the protection of men granted them social privileges, such as perceived superior moral integrity, that they would forfeit if given the right to vote.  These ideas contrast with her stated belief that women have similar governing potential to men and were capable of advancing society through private, professional work as teachers, doctors, and merchants.

All of the dissatisfaction in life made her dream of a more ideal society and from 1899 to 1918, she proclaimed herself a socialist and wrote an article for the International Socialist Review concerning socialism, but her version of socialism had a strict racial separation that mandated "the black man to improve himself without interfering in the white man's civilization."  Her racism once again came through when she wrote about the superiority of the white race over the black and boasting that with the help of the Ku Klux Klan the color line had been preserved in her home town. Despite her bitterness with the inequality of the role of women in society, she did not support women's suffrage.  Although her views regarding race and gender in the late nineteenth century reflect typical Southern beliefs, her outstanding and prolific career as an educator and botanical scientist separated Andrews from the typical plantation housewife that her earlier writings romanticized.

Botanist
While teaching at Wesleyan Female College in Macon, GA, Charlotte Ford cites Andrews as having her first formal contact with botany through contact with the botany professor, Charles Townsend, although her interest truly sparked from her childhood days exploring the forest around Haywood. Andrews styled herself as an amateur botanist, collecting samples and doing minor research whenever she could find the time.  During her botanical career, Andrews became a strong proponent of conservation, using her published pieces to rail against turpentine distillers and developers for destroying woodlands.  Her first textbook, Botany All the Year Round, published in 1903, aimed at a high school audience, was particularly useful for rural schools. It contained activities and labs aimed at attracting these schools to a low-budget scientific discipline that utilized the natural world around them, instead of pricey experimental materials. A Practical Course in Botany, her second textbook, however, was aimed more at a college and university audience and stressed the relationship between botany and more practical fields such as agriculture and economics.  Internationally acclaimed, Practical Botany was translated for use in French schools.  Andrews was also nominated to be a member of the Italian International Academy of Science, although she was too old at the time to travel to Naples and accept the honor. In the end she bequeathed the royalties from her books to the city of Rome, GA for a municipal forest reserve, although the city eventually turned the money back over to her estate because of lack of funds, probably due to the depression.

Andrews died in Rome, GA on January 21, 1931, at the age of ninety. She is buried in the family plot in Resthaven Cemetery, in Washington, GA.

Gallery

References

Ohles, John F.  Biographical Dictionary of American Educators, Vol. 1.  Westport: Greenwood Press, 1978.

External links

The War-Time Journal of a Georgia Girl, 1864-1865. New York: D. Appleton and Company, 1908.
 

19th-century American novelists
American women novelists
American essayists
Educators from Mississippi
American women botanists
American botanical writers
Novelists from Georgia (U.S. state)
1840 births
1931 deaths
19th-century American women scientists
19th-century American botanists
American women essayists
Women science writers
19th-century American women writers
19th-century essayists
Ohio Wesleyan University faculty